The 2022 Desert X-Prix was an Extreme E off-road race that was held on 19 and 20 February 2022 in the future planned city of Neom, Saudi Arabia. It was the first round of the electric off-road racing car series' second season, and also marked the second running of the event, albeit in a different location to 2021. The final was won by Mikaela Åhlin-Kottulinsky and Johan Kristoffersson for reigning champions Rosberg X Racing, ahead of the Acciona  Sainz XE Team and Team X44.

Classification

Qualifying

Notes:
 Tie-breakers were determined by Super Sector times.
  – Abt Cupra XE were demoted one position and deducted two intermediate points for causing a collision in heat 1 of qualifying 2.

Semi-final 1

Notes:
  – Xite Energy Racing originally finished second, but later received a 10-second time penalty for taking down a waypoint flag.

Semi-final 2

Crazy Race

Notes:
 Veloce's Christine GZ was replaced by Hedda Hosås after suffering an injury in qualifying.

Final

Notes:
 The race was red-flagged at the end of lap 1 after a crash for McLaren's Tanner Foust. All four other teams took the restart, with the gaps maintained.
  – Team awarded 5 additional points for being fastest in the Super Sector.

References

External links
 

|- style="text-align:center"
|width="35%"|Previous race:2021 Jurassic X-Prix
|width="30%"|Extreme E Championship2022 season
|width="35%"|Next race:2022 Island X-Prix
|- style="text-align:center"
|width="35%"|Previous race:2021 Desert X-Prix
|width="30%"|Desert X-Prix
|width="35%"|Next race:N/A
|- style="text-align:center"

Desert X-Prix
Desert X-Prix
Desert X-Prix